The 1955 Texas A&M Aggies football team represented Texas A&M University in the 1955 college football season as a member of the Southwest Conference (SWC). The Aggies were led by head coach Bear Bryant in his second season and finished with a record of seven wins, two losses and one tie (7–2–1 overall, 4–1–1 in the SWC).

Schedule

References

Texas AandM
Texas A&M Aggies football seasons
Texas AandM Aggies football